The first Legislative Assembly of Madras state was constituted in May 1952. This was following the first election held in Madras state after the Indian Independence.

Overview 
Under the New Constitution of India, The Legislature consists of the Governor and two Houses known as the Legislative Council and the Legislative Assembly. The Madras Legislative Assembly consisted of 375 seats to be filled by election, distributed in 309 constituencies, 243 single-members constituencies, 62 double-member constituencies in each of which a seat had been reserved for Scheduled Castes and four two-member constituencies in each of which a seat had been reserved for Scheduled Tribes. Three seats were uncontested.

In 1953, after the formation of Andhra State which consisting of the Telugu-speaking areas and Bellary district was also merged with the Mysore State which consisting of Kannada speaking area. The Members of the Madras Legislative Assembly was reduced to 231. Consequent on the States Reorganisation Act, the number of members of the Assembly was again reduced to 190.

In the 1952 Madras State legislative assembly election, no single party obtained a simple majority to form an independent Government. C. Rajagopalachari (Rajaji) of the Indian National Congress became the Chief Minister after a series of re-alignments among various political parties and Independents. Rajaji was resigned in 1954 after the heavy opposition to his Hereditary education policy. In the ensuing leadership struggle, Kamaraj defeated Rajaji's chosen successor C. Subramaniam and became the Chief Minister on 31 March 1954.

Cabinet

Rajagopalachari's Cabinet 
The Cabinet under Rajagopalachari was sworn in on 10 April 1952.

Changes
 Ministers belonging to Bellary and Andhra constituencies (Naganna Gowda, Sankara Reddi, Pattabirama Rao, Sanjeevayya and Ranga Reddi) stepped down on 30 September 1953, a day before Andhra State split to form a separate state. The portfolios of Agriculture, Forests, Fisheries, Cinchona, Rural Welfare, Community Projects and National Extension Schemes were handed over to M. Bhaktavatsalam on 9 October 1953. Jothi Venkatachalam was made minister for Prohibition and Women's Welfare. K. Rajaram Naidu became the Minister for Local Administration. C. Subramaniam was given the additional portfolios of education, information and publicity. V. C. Palaniswamy Gounder was put in charge of Veterinary, Animal Husbandry and Harijan welfare.

Kamaraj's Cabinet
Members of cabinet who served between 13 April 1954 - 13 April 1957 under the Chief Ministership of Kamraj are:

 Changes

 Following the States Reorganisation Act of 1956, A. B. Shetty quit the Ministry on 1 March 1956 and his portfolio was shared between other ministers in the cabinet.

See also 
1951 Madras Legislative Assembly election
Tamil Nadu Legislative Assembly

References 

Tamil Nadu Legislative Assembly